De Leon Independent School District is a public school district based in De Leon, Texas (United States).

Located in Comanche County, small portions of the district extend into Erath and Eastland counties.

In 2009, the school district was rated "academically acceptable" by the Texas Education Agency.

Schools
De Leon High (Grades 9-12)
Perkins Middle (Grades 6-8)
De Leon Elementary (Grades PK-5)

Notable alumni

Sid Miller, Republican member of the Texas House of Representatives from Erath County, 2001-2013

References

External links
De Leon ISD

School districts in Comanche County, Texas
School districts in Erath County, Texas
School districts in Eastland County, Texas